Mülheimer Friedhof  is a cemetery in Cologne, Germany. It was established on 30 September 1904.

References

Cemeteries in Cologne